Andalas Grand Mosque (also known as Andaleh in Minangkabau language) is a mosque located in Andaleh Street no.56, Andaleh, East Padang district, Padang, West Sumatra, Indonesia. The mosque consists of a green building with two floors which has area of 1,200 m2, and a minaret in the southeast and an entrance gate in the south.

Reconstruction 
The mosque was one of the 608 religious sites in West Sumatra which got destroyed by the 2009 Sumatra earthquakes with a moment magnitude of 7.6. Given the alarming condition of the building, the mosque was later dismantled. Thus, religious activities in this mosque had been disrupted for a while, including the annual Ramadhan Pesantren during 2010 and 2011.

Reconstruction of the mosque was done shortly thereafter, whose fees were collected from public assistance sent through Yayasan Satu Untuk Negeri (the One to Home) Foundation of TvOne. Reconstruction begun on April 29, 2010 and completed at a cost of 3.25 million rupiah in 2012, and the mosque was officially inaugurated by the Minister of Communication and Information Tifatul Sembiring on March 9, 2012.

See also 
 Islam in Indonesia
 List of mosques in Indonesia

References

External links 

 

Mosques in Padang
Cultural Properties of Indonesia in West Sumatra
Islam in West Sumatra
Andalas